Bob and Mike Bryan were the defending champions, and successfully defended the title, defeating Wesley Koolhof and Stefanos Tsitsipas in the final, 7–5, 7–6(10–8). This was their last Masters title.

Seeds

Draw

Finals

Top half

Bottom half

References

External Links
 Main draw

Miami Open – Men's Doubles
2019 Miami Open